The House October Surprise Task Force (formally Task Force of the Committee on Foreign Affairs to Investigate Certain Allegations Concerning the Holding of Americans as Hostages by Iran in 1980) was a task force instituted by the United States House of Representatives in 1992 to examine the October Surprise conspiracy theory which theorized that, during the 1980 United States presidential election, the Reagan campaign successfully negotiated with the government of Iran for a solution to the Iran hostage crisis that would not occur until after the election, so as to prevent President Jimmy Carter, Reagan's opponent, from getting an electoral boost. 

Following the publication of the task force report in January 1993, Task Force chairman Rep. Lee H. Hamilton published an editorial in The New York Times in which he summarized the Task Force conclusion as being that "there was virtually no credible evidence to support the accusations."

Background
The House October Surprise Task Force followed investigation of related matters in the Iran-Contra affair by the Tower Commission, in which the October Surprise allegations had already been aired, and rejected. Media investigations of the October Surprise conspiracy theory took off in 1991 following the publication in April of a New York Times editorial by Gary Sick and a PBS Frontline documentary, and there were calls for a Congressional investigation.

In October 1991 the Senate's Foreign Relations Committee approved an investigation; but the bill to fund the $600,000 budget was filibustered by Republicans. Some hearings were held by the Senate Foreign Relations Subcommmitte on Near East and South Asian Affairs (then chaired by Terry Sanford) in November 1991, until an unnamed Republican senator, invoking a rarely used rule requiring Senate permission for committees to hold formal hearings, filed an objection, bringing the hearing to a close whilst Gary Sick was testifying. In December 1991 Sanford and Senator James M. Jeffords appointed a special counsel to investigate. This report, published on 19 November 1992, concluded that there was probably no Republican deal to delay hostage release, but that William Casey (Reagan's campaign director) "probably 'conducted informal, clandestine and potentially dangerous efforts' on the campaign's behalf to monitor the hostage situation."

In early February 1992 the House of Representatives voted to launch an investigation, with no Republican support and 34 Democrats opposing. This became the House October Surprise Task Force.

Personnel
The Task Force was run by people with experience with the related Iran-Contra affair. It was chaired by Representative Lee H. Hamilton (D-Ind), who had chaired the House Select Committee to Investigate Covert Arms Transactions with Iran. The Vice-chairman was Representative Henry Hyde (R-Ill), who had been a member of the Committee. The Committee's 1987 report (jointly with a Senate committee, as the Congressional Committees Investigating The Iran-Contra Affair) mentioned the October Surprise in a paragraph-long footnote, noting only that the Reagan campaign said it had rejected approaches from "individuals who claimed to be Iranian intermediaries."

The Task Force's Chief Counsel, Lawrence Barcella, was a former federal prosecutor best known for the Edwin P. Wilson case; in 1985 Barcella had given a legal opinion to an unnamed government official on giving the go-ahead to an Iran-Contra-related private weapons shipment. Barcella had also been a partner at law firm Laxalt, Washington, Perito & Dubuc, where, according to the Senate Bank of Credit and Commerce International report, Barcella worked directly with Paul Laxalt, then a partner in the law firm and previously chairman of the 1980 Reagan election campaign, on the BCCI account after BCCI was charged with money-laundering. BCCI had been used by Oliver North as part of the Iran-Contra operations. Hamilton blocked the proposed appointment to the Task Force staff of R. Spencer Oliver, then Chief Counsel of the United States House Committee on Foreign Affairs, after Hyde objected. Oliver had pressed for the investigation and suspected the claims were true, which "raised a red flag with the minority", Hamilton later explained. The Task Force's Chief Minority Counsel, Richard J. Leon, had been Deputy Chief Minority Counsel in the Congressional Iran-Contra investigation.

For the month of June 1992 Peggy Adler, was employed by the Task Force as an Assistant Investigator.

Process
The Task Force had a bipartisan staff of lawyers and investigators, which "conducted over 230 formal interviews and depositions, many with witnesses whose statements had never been taken under oath... analyzed hundreds of thousands of documents, including raw intelligence information... [and] reviewed thousands of records held by individuals, including ex-Iranian officials." In an interview in 2010, Representative Mervyn Dymally, a Task Force member, said that "there was never a 'consultative' process between the task force members and the lead investigators about the inquiry. Mostly, he said, a couple of members might show up for a closed meeting and get 'a slight briefing' from Barcella."

The Senate report in November 1992 said it hoped the House Task Force would be able to address various unanswered questions. Associated Press noted that "circumstances 'suggest a willful effort to prevent' investigators from having timely access to other papers, the report said." In the case of some classified documents relating to the National Security Council, this included the recommendation from the National Security Council that they be provided only to Barcella and Leon, and that members of Congress wanting to view the documents would have to submit a request in writing. Barcella and Leon would be "permitted to read relevant portions of the documents and to take notes, but ... the State Department [would] retain custody of the documents and the notes at all times." The strategy also included media aspects, including "mounting a public relations campaign attacking the investigation's costs and encouraging friendly journalists to denounce the story."

The Task Force was only authorised by Congress to operate until the end of the Congressional session, in early January 1993. As evidence came into the inquiry in December 1992, following a lengthy strategy of delay from the White House, the Task Force's chief counsel asked for a 3-month extension, which was not granted. Lee Hamilton later said he did not recall the request, but might have explained the issue of the authorization limit, which would have required Congressional approval to extend. Late-arriving evidence included a letter dated 17 December 1992 from Abolhassan Banisadr, who had become President of Iran after winning the Iranian presidential election, 1980. The letter described Banisadr's conflict with the Ayatollah Khomeini over the negotiations with the US government and with the Reagan campaign, including an episode where Banisadr had called a public meeting in September to expose the affair, which he called off after Khomeini passed a new offer to the US (which was ultimately derailed by the Iranian parliament).

In 2017, a declassified CIA 1980 memo was released in which the "Agency had concluded Iranian hardliners such as Ayatollah Khomeini were 'determined to exploit the hostage issue to bring about President Carter’s defeat in the November elections.'" According to MuckRock, the findings appear "to have been either unavailable to or ignored by those composing the Joint Report of the October Surprise Task Force."

Published report
Representative Mervyn Dymally refused to sign the final report. On January 3, Dymally submitted a dissenting opinion to the final report, declaring, in relation to the report's treatment of evidence for the crucial Madrid meeting, that "just because phones ring and planes fly doesn't mean that someone is there to answer the phone or is on the plane." Dymally said that Representative Lee H. Hamilton had warned him that if he did not withdraw his dissent "I will have to come down hard on you." The following day Hamilton (in a move he later insisted was unconnected) fired the entire staff of the Africa subcommittee, which Dymally had chaired before his retirement from Congress, which had just taken effect." Hoping to save his former staffers' jobs, Dymally agreed to withdraw his dissent, but refused to put his name to the official report.

Conclusions
The final report, published on 13 January 1993, concluded "there is no credible evidence supporting any attempt by the Reagan presidential campaign—or persons associated with the campaign—to delay the release of the American hostages in Iran". Hamilton also added that the vast majority of the sources and material reviewed by the committee were "wholesale fabricators or were impeached by documentary evidence". The report also expressed the belief that several witnesses had committed perjury during their sworn statements to the committee, among them Richard Brenneke, who claimed to be a CIA agent.

Documentary evidence
The documentary evidence collected by the Task Force was put into storage near the Rayburn House Office Building.

References

Sources
 Joint report of the Task Force to Investigate Certain Allegations Concerning the Holding of American Hostages by Iran in 1980 ("October Surprise Task Force"), US GPO, 1993

External links
 Charles Cogan deposition, 21 December 1992
 State Department memo, 4 November 1991

Iran–Contra affair
United States national commissions